Southeast Music Chart Awards, is a Chinese music awards ceremony that is presented by SETV, which created a pop music news TV program called FeiChangYinYue, featuring Southeast Music Chart since 2002.

Ceremony

Categories

References 

Chinese music awards